Stenothecidae is an extinct family of fossil univalved Cambrian molluscs which may be either gastropods or monoplacophorans.

The name of this taxon should not be confused with that of the class Stenothecoida, a group of problematic Cambrian invertebrates that have a bivalved (dorsal and ventral) shell.

Morphology 
The group comprises conical laterally compressed shells that may be smooth or ornamented with folds or ribs.  The shells are broadly limpet-like, which led to their initial consideration as monoplacophoran molluscs.

Taxonomy 

The taxonomic position of the group is unclear; it has been classified as a Yochelcionelloid or Helcionelloid. It is not obviously in the stem group of any modern molluscan class, and has been referred to the monoplacophora, although the monoplacophora are no longer considered to be a clade, and thus that classification means little more than "primitive mollusc".

Genera 
The family Stenothecidae consists of two subfamilies and the following genera:
 Stenothecinae Runegar & Jell, 1980 - synonym: Mellopegmidae Missarzhevsky, 1989
 Stenotheca Salter [in Hicks], 1872 – type genus of the family Stenothecidae
 Mellopegma Runegar & Jell, 1976
 Watsonellinae Parkhaev, 2001
 Watsonella Grabau, 1900 – type genus of the subfamily Watsonellinae
 Watsonella crosbyi Grabau – type species of the genus Watsonella

References

Further reading 
 
 http://www.palaeos.org/Stenothecoida 

Helcionelloida